Tom Hayes (born October 1979) is a former trader for UBS and Citigroup who was sentenced to 14 years in prison (reduced to 11 years on appeal) for dishonestly driving manipulation of the London Interbank Offered Rate (Libor), a bank reported interest rate, to enhance his trading results, which became known as the Libor scandal. Hayes, in the course of his defence, asserted managers were aware of his actions, and even condoned them. At trial Hayes was diagnosed with mild Asperger syndrome.

Early life
Thomas Alexander William Hayes was born in West London to Nicholas and Sandra Hayes, and initially grew up in Hammersmith. He moved with his mother to Winchester after his parents divorced, where he was raised by his mother, and Timothy, his stepfather. He attended The Westgate School, and, later, Peter Symonds College. A fellow student described him as an "incredibly smart geek".

After Peter Symonds, he attended the University of Nottingham, working in a restaurant kitchen during the summer holidays. He graduated with a degree in mathematics and engineering.

Career and education
In 2001, after time as an intern at UBS, he joined Royal Bank of Scotland's trainee programme, at the interest rate derivatives desk. After working for Royal Bank of Scotland as a junior trader, he was headhunted by Royal Bank of Canada in 2004, and, upon moving there, he assumed greater responsibility. After two years at RBC, he moved to UBS in late 2006. Hayes was placed in the Tokyo office of UBS, where he began making trades involving the discrepancies between the Libor rate and Japanese interest rates.

Hayes turned down an offer from Goldman Sachs in 2008, but in 2009, accepted an offer from Citigroup; the bank gave him a $3 million signing bonus.

Hayes graduated with an MBA from Hult International Business School studying at the London campus. He met Jennifer Arcuri there and founded software company Title X Technology with her in 2012, using developers in Bulgaria.

Manipulating LIBOR
Hayes traded derivatives at UBS and, later, Citigroup, in Tokyo. His favoured activity was basis trading, speculation on the movements in Libor expressed in multiple currencies and various durations, trades he might hedge with trades in other derivatives. The daily reporting of Libor rates by bankers around the world determined his success or failure in generating profits for his bank and bonuses for himself. By September 2008, a one basis point (1/100 of one per cent) move in Libor had about a US$750,000 effect on his bottom line.  Through a network of his broker contacts, including one at the world's largest inter-dealer broker, ICAP, he succeeded in having Libor reported lower than its true level in order to drive his profits and personal bonuses higher.

In less than 9 months, in 2010, Hayes was fired by Citi for his Libor activities. In its letter dismissing the 35-year-old former trader, the bank wrote: "Citigroup has uncovered that you attempted to manipulate the Yen Libor and [the Tokyo equivalent] Tibor rates in order to benefit your trading position," which it said was a clear breach of its code of conduct, “resulting in the possibility of serious regulatory actions”. After being fired, he moved back to England, where he day traded with his Citi bonus.

Arrest and trial
On December 11, 2012, Hayes was arrested by British authorities for his involvement in manipulating Libor rates, and on December 19, he was charged by the United States for the same crime. In order to avoid extradition to and subsequent trial by and imprisonment in the U.S., Hayes initially cooperated with the Serious Fraud Office, providing eighty hours of interviews so as to be charged by the United Kingdom. After being charged, Hayes withdrew his offer of cooperation, intending instead to fight the charges levied by the SFO. In response, the SFO narrowed the scope of their charges, so leaving less overlap between charges by American and British prosecutors, creating the possibility of a second trial in the United States.

Hayes was diagnosed with a mild version Asperger syndrome before his trial and was accompanied by a court-appointed aide during the trial. Throughout the trial, prosecutors used Hayes' SFO interviews to establish his greed and corruption. The defence attempted to illustrate that manipulation of Libor was both widespread and expected as part of Hayes' job description, with senior management aware of the tactic.

Conviction
In August 2015, Hayes was sentenced to fourteen years in prison, to serve a minimum half of this sentence before being considered for early release. The judge, Jeremy Cooke, indicated he wished to "send a signal" to traders involved in illegal trading, as the sentence was significantly harsher than those given to other individuals convicted of financial crimes, such as Nick Leeson. Hayes maintained his innocence through the trial process, notwithstanding having stated during SFO interviews,

"Well look, I mean, it’s a dishonest scheme, isn’t it? And I was part of the dishonest scheme, so obviously I was being dishonest."

Appeal
Appeals by Hayes against conviction failed but his sentence was reduced by the Court of Appeal comprising Sir Brian Leveson, Elizabeth Gloster and John Thomas, Baron Thomas of Cwmgiedd to eleven years, under the same parole conditions.

Having exhausted all avenues of appeal, in May 2016, Hayes instructed solicitor Karen Todner to make an application for review by the Criminal Cases Review Commission (CCRC). In December 2021, the CCRC handed down a provisional judgement not to refer Hayes' case to the Court of Appeal.

In October 2022, the United States dismissed criminal charges against Hayes, practically decriminalizing the manipulation of LIBOR.

Time in prison
In 2016, Hayes released letters concerning his time in prison. In them, he described being held separately from other prisoners, for his protection, in a "segregation unit". In 2019 he was moved to HM Prison Ford. Interviewed in "The Times" Hayes spoke of the struggles with his mental health and how becoming a Christian and the ministry of the church had helped him to survive.

On 29 January 2021 Hayes was released on licence from Ford open prison having served half his sentence.

Personal life
Hayes' marriage to Sarah Tighe, a corporate lawyer in London, did not last the duration of his imprisonment. Although separated, the couple remain on good terms and Tighe campaigned for Hayes' conviction to be quashed. They have one child, Joshua.
At trial Hayes was diagnosed with mild Asperger syndrome.

In March 2021, Hayes was also diagnosed with Multiple sclerosis, which he stated was aggravated by his time in prison.

See also
Jérôme Kerviel: A French trader convicted of similar crimes.

References

Hult International Business School alumni
Alumni of the University of Nottingham
Living people
British people convicted of fraud
People with Asperger syndrome
1979 births